The Murderer is Afraid at Night (French: L'assassin a peur la nuit) is a 1942 French crime drama film directed by Jean Delannoy and starring Mireille Balin,  Jean Chevrier and Louise Carletti. A film noir it was shot at the Victorine Studios in Nice in Vichy-controlled France. The film's sets were designed by the art director Georges Wakhévitch. It may have also acted as an allegory for Occupied France to look forward to a future when it is free after its Liberation.

Synopsis
In the South of France Olivier a professional burglar is on the run after a job goes wrong. He takes shelter in the countryside after befriending a quarry worker and has a romantic encounter with his sister Monique. However his former lover the vampish Monique, who he has robbed to support her materialistic demands, tracks him down and threatens to shoot him. He ultimately surrenders to the police in the knowledge that once he has served a spell in prison he can look forward to a future with Monique in which he is truly free.

Cast
 Mireille Balin as Lola Gracieuse
 Jean Chevrier as Olivier Rol 
 Louise Carletti as Monique
 Henri Guisol as Bébé-Fakir
 Georges Lannes as Paluaud
 Pierrette Caillol as Émilienne
 Charlotte Clasis as Monique and Gilbert's grand-mother
 Alexandre Fabry as Father Toine 
 Lucien Callamand as the manager of the "Petit Brummel"
 Jacques Tarride as Joseph
 Roland Pégurier as young Pierrot 
 Gilbert Gil as Gilbert
 Jules Berry as Jérôme
 Gisèle Alcée as Juliette

References

Bibliography
Walker-Morrison, Deborah. Classic French Noir: Gender and the Cinema of Fatal Desire. Bloomsbury Publishing, 2020.

External links 
 

1942 films
1942 crime drama films
1940s French-language films
1942 drama films
1942 crime films
French crime drama films
Films directed by Jean Delannoy
Films shot at Victorine Studios
Films based on French novels
1940s French films